Bell Common is a settlement in Essex, England and forms the southern part of the town of Epping.

Tunnel

The Bell Common Tunnel is a covered section of the M25 motorway in Bell Common. The route of the motorway at this point was forced into a very narrow gap between the ecologically important Epping Forest to the south and the settlements to the north. The decision was therefore made to put the motorway underground. The tunnel is 470 metres long and was constructed between 1982 and 1984 using the cut and cover method.

References

Epping Forest District